The Cowboy King is a 1922 American silent Western film directed by Charles R. Seeling and starring Guinn 'Big Boy' Williams, Patricia Palmer and Elizabeth De Witt.

Cast
 Guinn 'Big Boy' Williams as Dud Smiley 
 Patricia Palmer as Ethel Dunlap
 Elizabeth De Witt as Mrs Stacey
 William Austin as Wilbur
 Chet Ryan as Life Butters
 William Dyer as Bart Hadley 
 Mae Summers as Norma

References

External links
 

1922 films
1922 Western (genre) films
American black-and-white films
Films directed by Charles R. Seeling
Silent American Western (genre) films
1920s English-language films
1920s American films